James W. Queen & Company was an optical and scientific instrument company located at 924 Chestnut Street, Philadelphia, Pennsylvania, with a branch office in New York City, and active in various forms from 1853 to 1925, and subsequently as Gray Instrument Company until 1952.

In 1853 Mr James W. Queen began in the city of Philadelphia a small business in optical and philosophical apparatus. In 1859 he joined with Mr. Samuel L. Fox, and under their personal supervision and management, the business steadily developed. In 1870 Mr James W. Queen retired, and Mr. S.L. Fox continued the business under the title of James W. Queen & Co. It continued under this name until 1893, when it was incorporated as Queen & Co. In 1912 the company was reorganized as the Queen-Gray Co. by John G. Gray and continued as such until Mr. Gray's death in 1925, after which it became the Gray Instrument Company.

By 1888 the company had six departments:
 physical and chemical
 engineering
 ophthalmic
 microscopical
 magic lantern
 photographic

Among the instruments and apparatus made were air pumps, astronomical instruments, induction coils, Holtz machines, gyroscopes, drawing and mathematical instruments, surveying instruments, and instruments for electrical measurements. In 1901 Queen and Co. manufactured a large induction coil for the Japanese government that could create sparks 32 inches long, to be used for wireless telegraphy.

References 

 National Museum of American History collection
 James W. Queen & Co. catalogs, Smithsonian Institution collection
 American Artifacts description

Manufacturing companies based in Philadelphia
Instrument-making corporations